Kostyukhnivka (Ukrainian: Костюхнівка, Polish: Kostiuchnówka) is a village in Kamin-Kashyrskyi Raion of Volyn Oblast, Ukraine, but was formerly administered within Manevytskyi Raion.

In 1916, it was the site of the Battle of Kostiuchnówka between the Russian Army and the Polish Legions in the opening phase of the Brusilov Offensive of World War I.

References 
Костюхнівка

Villages in Kamin-Kashyrsky Raion